MK-2048 is the Merck & Co. designation for a molecule in its pre-clinical drug discovery that is an integrase inhibitor-class of agent intended to be used against HIV infection.  It is a second generation integrase design thought to be superior to the first available integrase inhibitor, raltegravir, in that "MK-2048 has a dissociation half-life of 32 hours on wild-type integrase—more than four times that of raltegravir", and its dissociation half-life against the important HIV integrase mutant N155H was on the same order of magnitude as that of raltegravir against wild-type virus, leading the Merck presenter to suggest the possibility of "reduced susceptibility to resistance mutations" for the second generation drug. MK-2048 is being investigated for use as part of a pre-exposure prophylaxis (PrEP) approach to the treatment of HIV infection. At the time of these reports, there was no indication of the time by which "MK-2048, or related compounds, [would] be ready for clinical trials".

References

Integrase inhibitors
Experimental drugs